Spirit Level Film is a British film production and distribution company specialising in political documentaries and motoring films. It was founded in 2001 by Richard Symons.

List of Spirit Level films

Produced and distributed titles 

The Snake and the Stallion (2001)
The Ministry of Truth (2007)
The Fear Factory] (2009)
The Price of Kings (2012)

Distributed titles 

C’était un Rendezvous (Claude Lelouch)
Shaken & Stirred
GT Racer: Season 1
GT Racer: Season 2
GT Racer: La Carrera Panamericana
The Jolly Boys' Last Stand
Le Mans - Special Edition
Bullitt - Special Edition
'Six of the Best'
Chinatown
Play it Again, Sam
Rosemary's Baby
Sunset Boulevard
The Warriors
The Parallax View
 Racing Dreams

Panoramica 

In 2004, Spirit Level created the ambient film label Panoramica in collaboration with Ryko founder Don Rose.

Panoramica titles 

Bob Carlos Clarke – Too Many Nights
Eric Koziol – Ripple in the Eye
Mick Rock – Punk Drunk Love
Out There – Images from NASA Archive
Peter Kennard – To Die For
The Images of Franco Fontana
Yann Arthus-Bertrand – Earth from the Air

References

External links

Television production companies of the United Kingdom
Film production companies of the United Kingdom